Doctor Robert William Irvine, (1853–1897) nicknamed "Bulldog", was a Scotland international rugby football player.

Rugby Union career

Amateur career

He played for Edinburgh Academicals.

Provincial career

He represented Edinburgh District against Glasgow District in the Inter-City matches; and played in the first match in 1872.

He represented East of Scotland District against West of Scotland District in 1876.

International career

Family
He was the brother of Duncan Irvine who was also capped for Scotland.

References

Sources

  Bath, Richard (ed.) The Scotland Rugby Miscellany (Vision Sports Publishing Ltd, 2007 )

1853 births
1897 deaths
Rugby union players from Perth and Kinross
Scottish rugby union players
Scotland international rugby union players
Perthshire RFC players
Edinburgh District (rugby union) players
Edinburgh Academicals rugby union players
East of Scotland District players
Rugby union forwards